William Sutton may refer to:

 William Sutton (VC) (1830–1888), English recipient of the Victoria Cross
 Will Sutton (born 1991), American football player
 Will Sutton (footballer), English footballer
 Bill Sutton (New Zealand politician) (born 1944), New Zealand Labour politician
 Bill Sutton (Kansas politician), American politician and member of the Kansas House of Representatives
 William Sutton (songwriter), 18th-century songwriter/poet, possibly from Stockton
 William Sutton (Southport) (1752–1840), hotelier
 Bill Sutton (artist) (1917–2000), New Zealand artist
 Willie Sutton (1901–1980), bank robber
 William Richard Sutton (1833–1900), founder of Sutton Carriers and philanthropist founder of Sutton Housing Trusts
 William Sutton, co-founder of the Rover car company
 William Sutton, footballer who played for Everton F.C. in the 1894/95 season
 William Sutton (lawyer) (c.1410–1480), Irish judge
 William S. Sutton, Canadian politician in New Brunswick
 William John Sutton (1859–1914), timberman, pioneer and promoter of Vancouver Island, British Columbia